Acacia paradoxa  is a plant in the family Fabaceae. Its common names include kangaroo acacia, kangaroo thorn, prickly wattle, hedge wattle and paradox acacia.

Description
It is dense with foliage; the leaves are actually enlarged petioles known as phyllodes. They are crinkly and the new ones are covered in hairs. The bush is also full of long spines.

The spiny stipules that grow at the base of the phyllodes deter livestock from feeding on or too close to the plant.

Taxonomy
The species was first formally described by the botanist Augustin Pyramus de Candolle in 1813 as part of the work Catalogus Plantarum Horti Botanici Monspeliensis.  
The species name is from the Greek words para which means near and doxa meaning glory. This probably refers the unattractive and thorny shrub being quite showy when it is in bloom.

Many synonyms are known for the plant including; Acacia ornithophora, Acacia undulata, Mimosa paradoxa, Racosperma paradoxum, Acacia armata and Acacia hybrida.

Distribution
Kangaroo thorn is widely spread across Australia, regenerating from seed after disturbances, such as bush fire. Small birds, including wrens, use this plant as shelter and dwelling, while it is relied upon as a food source for moths, butterflies and other insects, birds also feed on its seeds.

It is endemic to south eastern parts of South Australia, much of Victoria, eastern New South Wales and south eastern parts of Queensland. It has become naturalised in parts of Western Australia and Tasmania.

The plant has also been introduced to other continents. In the United States, kangaroo thorn is a well-known noxious weed in California.

Cultivation
The plant is used as an ornamental or as a dense screening plant. It make an excellent habitat and food source for birds. It grows well in full sun or in a partly shaded position. It can be planted in dry to moist well-drained areas. Seeds require pre-treatment such as scarification prior to planting.

References

Further reading

External links
USDA Plants Profile
EncycloWeedia Profile
Photo gallery

paradoxa
Fabales of Australia
Flora of Victoria (Australia)
Flora of South Australia
Flora of New South Wales
Flora of Queensland
Taxa named by Augustin Pyramus de Candolle
Plants described in 1813
Flora of Western Australia
Flora of Tasmania